M. S. Guhan is an Indian film producer. He has been involved in hits such as Sivaji: The Boss, Thirupathi, Minsara Kanavu, Leader (2010 film), and recently Ayan. He is the son of noted producer M. Saravanan, who owns the AVM Studios in Chennai. His grandfather was the founder of AVM, Avichi Meiyappa Chettiar.

Filmography

References 

Living people
Indian film producers
Film producers from Chennai
Year of birth missing (living people)